The following are edible insects that are locally consumed, as listed by country.

Australia
Agrotis infusa (Bogong moth)
Bush coconut
Honeypot ant
Hyles livornicoides (Yeperenye caterpillar)
Witchetty grub

Burkina Faso 
Cirina butyrospermi (shea caterpillar)

Brazil 
Atta spp.

China
Wasp species eaten in Yunnan, China:
Vespa velutinia auraria
Vespa tropica ducalis
Vespa analis nigrans
Vespa variabilis
Vespa sorror
Vespa basalis
Vespa magnifica
Vespa mandarinia mandarinia
Vespa bicolor bicolor
Provespa barthelemyi
Polistes sagittarius

Other insects consumed in China:
Tenebrio molitor (mealworm)
Omphisa fuscidentalis (bamboo borer)
Bombyx mori (silkworm pupa)

European Union 
(Mainly: Netherland & Belgium)

Yellow Mealworm (of Beetle Tenebrio molitor)
Buffalo Worm
Waxworm Larvae
Locusta migratoria (Locust / Grasshopper)
Hermetia illucens (Black Soldier Flies)

India 
Darthula hardwickii
 Udonga montana

Indonesia
Insect species eaten in Indonesia:
Hyblaea puera (teak caterpillar; known as enthung jati in Javanese)
Brachytrupes portentosus
Valanga nigricornis
Patanga succincta
Pantala flavescens
Rhynchophorus ferrugineus (red palm weevil)
Chalcosoma atlas
Xylocopa latipes

Kalimantan
Protocerius sp.
Rhynchophorus ferrugineus
Batocera spp.
Lepidiota stigma
Chalcosoma moellenkampi
Odontolabis spp.
Leptocorisa oratoria (rice ear bug)
Nezara viridula (green stinkbug)
Pomponia merula
Apis dorsata
Apis cerana
Ropalidia spp.
Provespa anomala
Vespa spp.
Vespa tropica
Vespa affinis

Papua Province
Rhynchophorus bilineatus
Cosmopsaltria waine
Syntherata apicalis
Xylotrupes gideon
Cotinis spp.
Batocera spp.
Dihammus spp.
Rosenbergia mandibularis
Nezara viridula
Behrensiellus glabradus
Rhynchophorus richteri
Behrensiellus glabradus
Acherontia achesis
Nyctalemon patroclus goldiei
Batocera wallacei
Papilio lagleizei

Laos
Insect species eaten in Vientiane Province, Laos:
Omphisa fuscidentalis
Orientopsaltria sp.
Brachytrupes portentosus
Teleogryllus testaceus
Acheta domesticus
Helicopris bucephalus
Lethocerus indicus
Caelifera sp.
Apis spp.
Xylotrupes gideon
Gryllotalpa africana
Bombyx mori
Tessaratoma quadrata
Hierodula sp. ?
Vespa spp.
Hydrophilus affinis
Oecophylla smaragdina

Madagascar
Insects eaten in Madagascar:

 Acheta domesticus (Zazavery)
 Amphimallon solstitiale (Voangory)
 Bombyx mori (Landikely)
 Borocera cajani (Landibe)
 Borocera madagascariensis (Landibe)
 Bricoptis variolosa (Voangory)
 Gryllus bimaculatus (Akitra)
 Hexodon unicolor (Voangory)
 Locusta migratoria (Valala)
 Phyllophaga sp. (Voangory)
 Rhynchophorus sp. (Voangory)
 Rina nigra (Voanosy) 
 Scarites sp. (Voangory)
 Serica sp. (Voangory)
 Tenebrio molitor (Voangory)

Malaysia
Insects eaten in Sabah:

Rhynchophorus ferrugineus
Apis dorsata
Apis cerana
Ropalidia spp.
Leptocorisa oratoria (rice ear bug)
Nezara viridula (green stinkbug)
Erionata thrax (banana leaf-roller pupa)
Orientopsaltria spp. (brown and green cicadas)
Dundubia spp. (light green cicadas)
Oecophylla smaragdina
Camponotus gigas (giant forest ant)
Haaniella grayi grayi (stick insect eggs)

and in Sarawak:
Rhynchophorus ferrugineus  (sago worm)

Mali
The Northern Dogon people of Mopti Region, Mali consume grasshopper species such as:

Acorypha glaucopsis
Kraussaria angulifera (also a millet pest)
Kraussella amabile
Hieroglyphus daganensis

The Southern Region of Mali consume caterpillar species such as:

 Cirina butyrospermi (shea caterpillar)

Mexico
Mexico insects:
Aegiale hesperiaris (maguey worm)
Atta mexicana (ant)
Comadia redtenbacheri (mezcal worm)
Eucheira socialis (Madrone butterfly)
Sphenarium spp. (chapulines)
Liometopum apiculatum larvae  (escamol)
 Several Choleoptera larvae (chahuis)
Dactylopius coccus females used as red food dye

New Caledonia 
Agrianome fairmairei (Montrouzier, 1861) (Vers de Bancoule)

Peru
Insect species eaten in Peru:

 Brassolis sophorae (Ahuihua)
 Metardaris cosinga (Huaytampo)
 Chrysophora chrysochlora (Sun-sún)
 Rhynchophorus palmarum (Suri, Shampuru)
 Rhinostomus barbirostris (Yurak suri, Suri blanco)
 Atta cephalotes (Mamaku, Sikisapakuru)
 Metamasius hemipterus
 Strategus jugurtha
 Megaceras crassum
 Cephalotes atratus
 Crematogaster sordidula
 Agelaia pallipes
 Mischocyttaru spp.
 Cyphomyia auriflamma
 Macrodontia cervicornis
 Acrocinus longimanus
 Dynastes hercules
 Platycoelia lutescens
 Atta sexdens
 Euchroma gigantea (Intimaman)
 Brassolis astyra
 Eupalamides cyparissias
 Crematogaster stollii
 Polybia platycephala
 Polybia furnaria
 Helicoverpa zea
 Chloridea virescens
 Mocis latipes (Vareador)
 Lusura chera
 Arsenura armida (Bolasho, Bolayna awiwa)

Philippines
Insect species eaten in the Philippines:
Apis dorsata
Apis cerana
Trigona biroi
Gryllotalpa sp.
Leucopolis irrorata (June beetle larvae)
Locusta migratoria manilensis
Camponotus spp.
Palembus dermestoides

South Africa
Gonimbrasia belina (mopane worm)
Encosternum delegorguei (inflated stinkbug)

Thailand
Some of the most commonly consumed insects in Thailand are:
Acheta domestica (house cricket)
Gryllus bimaculatus (Mediterranean field cricket)
Brachytrupes portentosus (short-tailed cricket)
Omphisa fuscidentalis (bamboo borer)
Bombyx mori (silkworm pupa)
Oecophylla smaragdina (weaver ant)
Lethocerus indicus (giant water bug)

Heterometrus longimanus (Asian forest scorpion) is also consumed.

Below is a more comprehensive list of the insect species that are consumed in Thailand.
Coleoptera
Aeolesthes sp.
Agrianome fairmairei (Montrouzier, 1861)
Apriona germai
Aristobia approximator
Dorysthenes buqueti
Plocaederus obesus
Plocaederus ruficornis
Arrhines hiruts
Arrhines 2 spp.
Astycus gestvoi
Cnaphoscapus decoratus
Episomus sp.
Hypomesus squamosus
Pollendera atomaria
Sepiomus aurivilliusi
Tanymecus sp.
Rhynchophorus ferrugineus
Hydrobiomorpha spinicollis
Hydrophilus bilineatus
Sternolophus rufipes
Erectes stiticus
Cybister tripunctatus asiaticus
Cybister limbatus
Cybister rugosus
Hydaticus rhantoides
Laccophilus pulicarius
Copelatus sp.
Rhantaticus congestus
Xylotrupes gideon
Oryctes rhinoceros
Adoretus spp.
Agestrata orichalca
Anomala anguliceps
Anomala antique
Anomala chalcites
Anomala cupripes
Anomala pallida
Apogonia sp.
Chaetadoretus cribratus
Holotrichia 2 spp.
Maladera sp.
Pachnessa sp.
Protaetia sp.
Sophrops absceussus
Sophrops bituberculatus
Sophrops rotundicollis
Sophrops 2 spp.
Aphodius crenatus
Aphodius marginellus
Aphodius putearius
Aphodius sp.
Cathasius birmanicus
Cathasius molossus
Copris carinicus
Copris nevinsoni
Paracopris punctulatus
Microcopris reflexus
Paracopris sp.
Gymnopleurus melanarius
Heliocopris bucephalus
Heteronychus lioderes
Liatongus rhadamitus
Onitis niger
Onitis subopagus
Onthophagus orientalis
Onthophagus avocetta
Onthophagus bonasus
Onthophagus khonmiinitnoi
Onthophagus papulatus
Onthophagus sagittarius
Onthophagus seniculus
Onthophagus ragoides
Onthophagus tragus
Onthophagus tricornis
Onthophagus trituber
Onthophagus sp.
Sternocera aequisignata
Sternocera ruficornis

Hemiptera
Diplonychus sp.
Lethocerus indicus
Anoplocnemis phasiana
Homoeocerus sp.
Cylindrostethus scrutator
Laccotrephes rubber
Ranatra longipes thai
Ranatra varripes
Anisops barbutus
Anisops bouvieri
Pygopalty sp.
Tessaratoma papillosa
Tessaratoma javanica

Odonata
Aeshna sp.
Ceriagrion sp.
Epophtalmia vittigera bellicose
Rhyothemis sp.

Hymenoptera
Apis dorsata
Apis florea
Oecophylla smaragdina
Carebara castanea
Vespa affinis indosinensis

Orthoptera
Acrida cinerea
Acrida sp.
Chondacris rosea
Chorthippus sp.
Cyrtacanthacris tatarica
Ducetia japonica
Locusta migratoria
Mecopoda elongate
Oxya sp.
Parapleurus sp.
Patanga japonica
Patanga succincta
Shirakiacris shirakii
Trilophidia annulata
Atractomorpha sp.
Ratanga avis
Teleogryllus testaceus
Teleogryllus mitratrus
Teleogryllus sp.
Modicogryllus confirmatus
Brachytrupes portentosus
Gryllus bimaculatus
Gryllus sp.
Gymnogryllus 2 spp.
Pteronemobius sp.
Velarifictorus sp.
Gryllotalpa africana microphtalma
Tenodera ariddifolia sinensis
Mantis religiosa
Euparatettix sp.
Euconocephalus incertus
Conocephalus maculates
Conocephalus sp.
Onomarchus sp.
Pseudophyllus titan
Homoeoxipha sp.

Isoptera
Macrotermes gilvus

Lepidoptera
Bombyx mori
Erionata thrax thrax
Omphisa fuscidentalis

Homoptera
Chremistica sp.
Dundubia sp.
Orientopsaltria sp.
Platylomia sp.

References

 
Insects in culture